The Midlands Plateau is a plateau covering approximately 3,200 km2 in the Midlands of England, bounded by the Rivers Severn, Avon and Trent.

The plateau is made up of three subdivisions: the Birmingham Plateau forms the central core, separated by the valley of the River Blythe from the East Warwickshire Plateau to the east, and by the valley of the River Stour from the Mid-Severn Plateau to the west.

References

Bibliography

Plateaus of England
Natural regions of England